CEJ may refer to:

 Cementoenamel junction
 Central European Jamboree
 Chernihiv Shestovitsa Airport
 Coastal Engineering Journal, a publication by World Scientific
 CE Johansson AB, the parent firm established by Carl Edvard Johansson
 Cotton-Eyed Joe